The Ingrian revolt was a secessionist rebellion in the region of Ingria during the Russian Civil War. It aimed to be integrated into Finland, but no such arrangements were made and it collapsed less than a year after its formation. It only ever controlled a small northern part of the region, which gave it its name of the Republic of North Ingria.

Prelude 
After the Great Northern War ended in 1721, Russia acquired the large region of Ingria. There were a large number of Ingrian Finns in the region, and by 1917 there were more than 140,000. However, tensions were high under the Bolshevik rule. Following the October Revolution in St Petersburg, the Grand Duchy of Finland  immediately began preparing to declare its independence. On December 6, 1917, the Senate adopted the Declaration of Independence by a vote of 100 to 88. This, combined with the Estonian War of Independence, inspired many Ingrians to thoughts of rebellion.

Rebellion 

Despite the complaints of many cautious Ingrian leaders such as Kaapri Tunny who said such an action could "lead to disaster", Colonel Georg Elfengren and his North Ingrian Regiment crossed the border from Finland into North Ingria on June 27, 1919 and occupied the villages of Kirjasalo, Mikkulainen, Lembolovo and Vaskelovo. He was soon defeated by red forces and forced to retreat back across the border. However, in September he crossed back over again and occupied the same villages. After being defeated yet again, Georg decided to instead retreat to Kirjasalo and proclaimed the Republic of North Ingria, also known as the Republic of Kirjasalo after its capital. The new country had a population of roughly 15,000 and an area of 30 km2  (12 sq. miles). It also printed stamps to give the state legitimacy and a source of revenue. Elfengren became chairman, a post he kept until May. He was surprised to find that a large proportion of the populace were passive towards his cause, and did not support him as actively as they could. This seriously hindered Elfengren's efforts.

Collapse   
Finland had not offered significant support over the year to the rebellion, not wanting to sabotage its peace negotiations with the RSFSR. When it signed the Treaty of Tartu with the Soviets, part of the treaty was the handover of Kirjasalo. The North Ingrian regiment crossed the border into Finland to be disarmed, and Elfengren soon resigned from his station in the Finnish military to fight with the White Russians in Crimea. Villagers evacuated Kirjalaso, and red forces moved into the four villages controlled by the Republic and retook them.

Aftermath 
It is thought that a small number of the North Ingrians involved with the rebellion never reached Finland, and decades later appeals were put out in newspapers asking after them. Due to the policy of national delimitation in the Soviet Union, the area was given a certain degree of autonomy until 1939, when that was abolished and the area was joined to Pargolovo District.

See also 

 Republic of North Ingria
 Georg Elfengren
 Ingrian Finns

References

1920 in Finland
1920 in Russia
Russian Civil War
Conflicts in 1920
Rebellions in the Soviet Union